Nanopsis parvada is a species of sea snail, a gastropod in the family Cerithiopsidae. It was described by Rolán, Espinosa, and Fernández-Garcés, in 2007.

References

 Cecalupo A. & Robba E. (2010) The identity of Murex tubercularis Montagu, 1803 and description of one new genus and two new species of the Cerithiopsidae (Gastropoda: Triphoroidea). Bollettino Malacologico 46: 45-64.

parvada
Gastropods described in 2007